Tibia  is a genus of large sea snails, marine gastropod mollusks.

This genus was traditionally considered to be part of the family Strombidae, the true conchs and their allies. However, recent morphological as well as molecular studies indicate that these ("shinbone shells") should be recognised as a separate family, the Rostellariidae, and this is the way they are treated in the database WoRMS.

The recent species belong to three distinct genera, but several more genera are known from the fossil record.

Species
Species within the genus Tibia include:
Tibia curta (Sowerby, 1842) - Tuticorin, Southern India
Tibia fusus (Linnaeus, 1758) - Philippines
Tibia insulaechorab (Röding, 1798) - Red Sea
Tibia melanocheilus (Adams, 1854) - Turtle Island, Philippines; Brunei

Species brought into synonymy
Tibia delicatula Nevill, 1881 : synonym of Rostellariella delicatula (G. Nevill, 1881)
Tibia deliculata [sic]: synonym of Rostellariella delicatula (G. Nevill, 1881)
Tibia indiarum Röding, 1798: synonym of Tibia fusus (Linnaeus, 1758)
Tibia laurenti Duchamps, 1992: synonym of Rimellopsis powisii (Petit de la Saussaye, 1840)
Tibia luteostoma Angas, 1878: synonym of Tibia insulaechorab Röding, 1798
Tibia martinii Marrat, 1877: synonym of Rostellariella martinii (Marrat, 1877)
Tibia powisii (Petit de la Saussaye, 1840): synonym of Rimellopsis powisii (Petit de la Saussaye, 1840)

Note:
Tibia serrata (Perry, 1811) is now considered to be an aberrant morph of Tibia curta (G. B. Sowerby II, 1842)
Tibia serrata (G. Perry, 1811) - no longer valid

Related genera
Genus Rostellariella
Rostellariella delicatula (Nevill, 1881) - Northern Indian Ocean
Rostellariella lorenzi H. Morrison, 2005 - Arafura Sea, Indonesia
Rostellariella martinii (Marrat, 1877) - Philippines
Genus Rimellopsis
Rimellopsis powisii (Petit de la Saussaye, 1840) - Cebu, Philippines

References

External links

Rostellariidae
Taxa named by Peter Friedrich Röding